Paphiopedilum tigrinum is a species of plant in the family Orchidaceae. It is endemic to western Yunnan (China).

A distinct form has been named in 2005, initially as a distinct species:
 Paphiopedilum tigrinum f. smaragdinum (Z.J.Liu & S.C.Chen) O.Gruss

References

tigrinum
Critically endangered plants
Endemic orchids of China
Orchids of Yunnan
Taxonomy articles created by Polbot
Plants described in 1990